Lin Zhengbin (6 July 1957 – 10 February 2020) was a Chinese physician and organ transplant expert at Wuhan Tongji Hospital.

Biography
Lin graduated from Tongji Medical College in 1987, where he obtained a bachelor's degree in medicine. He was chief physician of the Institute of Organ Transplantation of Tongji Hospital. 

He retired in July 2017, but was rehired by Wuhan Tongji Hospital.

During the COVID-19 pandemic in China, Lin was infected with the virus. He died on 10 February 2020 due to complications caused by the disease.

References

1957 births
2020 deaths
People from Wuhan
Huazhong University of Science and Technology alumni
Kanazawa University alumni
Transplant surgeons
Physicians from Hubei
Deaths from the COVID-19 pandemic in China